Duprey is a surname. Notable people with the surname include:

Ana Roque de Duprey (1853–1933), educator, suffragist and one of the founders of the University of Puerto Rico
Brian Duprey (born 1967), former Maine State Representative from Hampden
Cyril Duprey (1897–1988), Trinidad and Tobago businessman
Donalda Duprey (born 1967), Canadian athlete
Janet Duprey (born 1945), Republican member of the New York State Assembly
Jean-Pierre Duprey (1930–1959), French poet and sculptor
Louise Duprey (1957–2000), British character actress
Maurice Duprey, politician in Manitoba, Canada
Rob Duprey, American rock musician